The Philippine Amateur Radio Association (PARA) is a national non-profit organization for amateur radio enthusiasts in the Philippines. Key membership benefits of PARA include the sponsorship of amateur radio operating awards and radio contests, and a QSL bureau for those members who regularly communicate with amateur radio operators in other countries. PARA represents the interests of Filipino Amateur Radio Operators/Enthusiasts before the national and international telecommunications regulatory authorities. PARA is the national member society representing the Philippines in the International Amateur Radio Union.

PARA is the recognized national umbrella association for the amateur radio service in the Philippines. The National Telecommunications Commission (NTC) - the country's telecommunications regulatory authority - issued Memorandum Circular No. 05-06-85 which says:

"In compliance to Ministry Circular No. 82-077, dated 20 October 1982, the Philippine Amateur Radio Association (PARA) as governed by the new PARA By Laws registered with the Securities and Exchange Commission, dated 08 May 1985, is hereby recognized by the National Telecommunications Commission as the national amateur radio organization. As such, PARA shall represent the Philippines Amateurs in all conferences, either local or international and with the end in view of fostering cordial relationship and efficient coordination between radio amateurs and the government.

To hasten the normal operation of the organization and the accreditation of other amateur radio clubs as required under NTC Memorandum Circular No. 01-01-84, dated 12 January 1984, every district and local clubs shall affiliate with PARA without unnecessary delay".

The recognition of PARA as the national association for the amateur radio service in the Philippines is emphasized anew NTC Memorandum Circular No. 03-08-2012, particularly Section VIII (2) which states that "The Philippine Amateur Radio Association (PARA) is the only recognized national society of amateurs."

Organizational structure

PARA elects a five-member executive board every three years. The board elect from among themselves the chief operating officer, vice chief operating officer, chief finance officer, and secretary general.

The PARA executive board for the term 2020 to 2022 are: 
 Pascua, Thelma C., DU1IVT
 Vicencio, Roberto Jose C., DU1VHY
 Pacana, Rolando Jr. B., DU1RP
 Almazan, Leo M., DU3ZX
 Legaspi, Sulpicio Henry M., 4F9DOC

PARA also elects its district managers to supervise affiliate clubs in the different call areas. The election is done simultaneous with the executive board. For 2020 to 2022 the following are the PARA district managers:
 District 1  –  Atanacio, Lawrence M., 4F1SVY
 District 2  –  Santos, Joaquin G., DU2AZK
 District 3  –  San Pedro, Dennis M,. DU3SE
 District 4  –  Canuto, Nomer T., DU4VX
 District 5  –  Jerick M. Silva, 4F5JMS
 District 6  –  Anceno, Arnolo P., DU6JEN
 District 7  –  Tan, Sidney James M,. DU7PH
 District 8  –  Garbonera, Roy G., DV8BQI
 District 9  –  Azucenas, Ruselo., DV9CWA

Membership

As the national association for amateur radio, PARA has for its members the different amateur clubs in the Philippines. Under existing NTC regulations, an amateur club can be accredited by the NTC if such club is an affiliate club of PARA.

The following is a list of affiliate clubs which have an article in the English-language Wikipedia.

District 1
 AMSAT Philippines (DX10)
 Boy Scouts of the Philippines (DX1BSP)
 Don Bosco Amateur Radio Club (DX1DBT)
 Malayan Colleges Laguna Amateur Radio Club (DX1MCL)
 PUPHAM-RCG PUPHAM Radio Communications Group (DX1PUP)
 Polytechnic University of the Philippines Radio Engineering Circle (DZ1PUP)
 Rizal Technological University Amateur Radio Club (DX1RTU)
 University of the Philippines Engineering Radio Guild (UP-ERG)
 University of Santo Tomas Amateur Radio Club (DX1UST)

References

International Amateur Radio Union member societies
Non-profit organizations based in the Philippines
Organizations based in Metro Manila
Organizations established in 1932
1932 establishments in the Philippines